Henriette Engel Hansen (born 15 April 1982) is a world champion Danish sprint canoer and marathon canoeist. She and team-mate Emma Aastrand Jørgensen won the K-2 1000 m title at the 2014 World Championships.

At the 2008 Summer Olympics, she was eliminated in the K-1 500 m semifinals.  At the 2012 Summer Olympics, she was eliminated in the K-1 200 m semifinals and placed seventh in the K-1 500 m event. At the 2016 Olympics she competed in the K-1 200 m and K-4 500 m and placed sixth in the latter event.

References

External links

 
 

1982 births
Canoeists at the 2008 Summer Olympics
Danish female canoeists
Living people
Olympic canoeists of Denmark
Canoeists at the 2012 Summer Olympics
Canoeists at the 2016 Summer Olympics
People from Hillerød Municipality
Sportspeople from the Capital Region of Denmark